William H. Davis served as Allegheny County Sheriff from 1954 to 1970.

See also

 Police chief
 List of law enforcement agencies in Pennsylvania

References

External links
Sheriff's Office homepage

American municipal police officers
American people of Italian descent
Allegheny County Sheriff
Pennsylvania Democrats